Callibracon is a genus of wasps in the family Braconidae.

References 

 Austin, A.D.; Quicke, D.L.J.; Marsh, P.M. 1994: The hymenopterous parasitoids of eucalypt longicorn beetles, Phoracantha spp. (Coleoptera: Cerambycidae) in Australia. Bulletin of entomological research, 84(2): 145–174.

External links 
 
 
 

Braconidae genera
Braconinae